Eleven or 11 may refer to:
11 (number), the natural number following 10 and preceding 12
 one of the years 11 BC, AD 11, 1911, 2011, or any year ending in 11

Literature
Eleven (novel), a 2006 novel by British author David Llewellyn
Eleven, a 1970 collection of short stories by Patricia Highsmith
Eleven, a 2004 children's novel in The Winnie Years by Lauren Myracle
Eleven, a 2008 children's novel by Patricia Reilly Giff
Eleven, a short story by Sandra Cisneros

Music
Eleven (band), an American rock band
Eleven: A Music Company, an Australian record label
Up to eleven, an idiom from popular culture, coined in the movie This Is Spinal Tap

Albums
11 (The Smithereens album), 1989
11 (Ua album), 1996
11 (Bryan Adams album), 2008
11 (Sault album), 2022
Eleven (Harry Connick, Jr. album), 1992
Eleven (22-Pistepirkko album), 1998
Eleven (Sugarcult album), 1999
Eleven (B'z album), 2000
Eleven (Reamonn album), 2010
Eleven (Martina McBride album), 2011
Eleven (Mr Fogg album), 2012
Eleven (Tina Arena album), 2015
Eleven (single album), 2021 debut single album by Ive

Songs
"11" (song), a 2013 song by Cassadee Pope from Frame by Frame
"Eleven" (Ive song), a 2021 debut single by Ive
"Eleven" (Khalid song), a 2020 song by Khalid
"Eleven", a 2006 song by ¡Forward, Russia! from Give Me a Wall
"Eleven", a 2011 song by Chameleon Circuit on Still Got Legs
"Eleven", a 2011 single by Fantine
"Eleven", a 2018 song by Last Dinosaurs from Yumeno Garden
"Eleven", a 1991 song by Primus from Sailing the Seas of Cheese
"Eleven", a 2018 song by Todrick Hall from Forbidden
 "Eleven", a 2013 song by C418 from Minecraft - Volume Beta
"The Eleven", a 1969 song by the Grateful Dead from Live/Dead

Television
Eleven, an Australian digital television multichannel, now renamed 10 Peach
Eleven (Television Production Company), a British television production company based in London
Eleven (Stranger Things), a character from the Netflix series Stranger Things
PIX 11, an American television channel covering New York, New Jersey, and Connecticut. Its slogan is "New York's Very Own"
KAN 11, an Israeli television channel

Other uses
11Eleven Project, documentary film created by Danielle Lauren
EleVen, a clothing range designed by tennis player Venus Williams
A football team or a bandy team, so called because of the number of players on the team
November, the eleventh month of the year
Windows 11, an operating system by Microsoft
iOS 11, an operating system by Apple

See also
11:11 (disambiguation)
Number 11 (disambiguation)
xi (disambiguation)
XI (disambiguation)
List of highways numbered 11